The University of Rio Grande and Rio Grande Community College (originally Rio Grande College) is a private university and public community college merged into one institution in Rio Grande, Ohio. It is accredited by the Higher Learning Commission (HLC).

The University of Rio Grande offers a range of courses and majors and is known in the region for its fine arts, education, and nursing programs. Additionally, its graduate program in teacher education was one of the few national programs structured around Howard Gardner's Theory of multiple intelligences. The university's Greer Museum hosts 5–6 visiting artists each year and houses the Brooks Jones Art Collection including works by Goya, Renoir, and Jasper Johns. The university Sculpture Garden contains 15 large-scale outdoor works by contemporary artists including Fletcher Benton.

History

Early history 
Ira Haning, a Free Will Baptist minister, persuaded Nehemiah and Permelia Atwood, along with Eustace St. James, affluent residents and entrepreneurs, to use their wealth to establish a college. Following Nehemiah's death in 1869, the responsibility for making this dream a reality fell to his wife Permelia. In 1873, Permelia Ridgeway Atwood established an endowment and deeded  of land for Rio Grande College, which officially opened on September 13, 1876. In its first year, Ransom Dunn was president as well as professor of mental and moral philosophy.

In its earliest years, Rio Grande provided leadership in preparing teachers and Baptist ministers.

20th century
By 1915, Rio Grande's major focus had shifted to teacher training, which continued as a virtually singular interest for nearly 60 years.

The affiliation with the Baptists formally ended in the early 1950s. During the same time period, the farm adjacent to the campus which was owned by the college (students worked there to produce dairy products), was sold to provide much-needed operating funds for the institution. A young businessman, Bob Evans, was the buyer.

The University Of Rio Grande's alma mater, "The Red and White" was written by Eustace St. James, a 1920 graduate and replaced a former alma mater written by Franz Josef Sucher.

In 1969, the North Central Association of Colleges and Schools approved Rio Grande's Accreditation. The Davis Library was constructed and dedicated three years before the first accreditation; the library was instrumental in winning accreditation.

Recent expansion 
From 1977 to 2008, Rio Grande's campus expanded to include several new buildings and a variety of academic programs. In 1989, Rio Grande College was renamed the University of Rio Grande in recognition of its expanding curriculum. Some of the new degree programs added to the university's curriculum in the last few years include interactive media, graphic design, radiologic technology, diagnostic medical sonography and respiratory therapy.  From 1996 to 1998, with tremendous community support and local assistance, Rio Grande established the Madog Center for Welsh Studies on campus (1996) and the Meigs Center in Middleport (1998).  In 2001, the faculty led in making changes in academic requirements for all students (the General Education curriculum) and in converting to a semester system.  In 2008, a new larger Meigs Center was constructed in Pomeroy above Meigs High School replacing the one in Middleport. Courses are also offered in Vinton County.  The university also offers distance-learning programs via the Internet.

Athletics 
The Rio Grande athletic teams are called the RedStorm. The university is a member of the National Association of Intercollegiate Athletics (NAIA), primarily competing in the River States Conference (RSC; formerly known as the Kentucky Intercollegiate Athletic Conference (KIAC) until after the 2015–16 school year) since the 2014–15 academic year; which they were a member on a previous stint from 1964–65 to 1970–71. The RedStorm previously competed in the Mid-South Conference (MSC) from 2009–10 to 2013–14, and in the defunct American Mideast Conference from 1971–72 to 2008–09.

Rio Grande competes in 22 intercollegiate varsity sports: Men's sports include baseball, basketball, bowling, cross country, golf, rugby, soccer, track & field, volleyball and wrestling; while women's sports include basketball, bowling, cross country, golf, rugby, soccer, softball, track & field and volleyball; and co-ed sports include bass fishing, cheerleading and eSports.

Nickname 
In 2008, prior to their current nickname and mascot, its former nickname was the Redmen (for men) and Redwomen (for women).

Men's soccer 
The men's soccer team has won two NAIA Men's Soccer National Championships, in 2003 and 2015. Through the 2014 season, the men's soccer team has had 46 (NAIA) All-Americans.

Women's basketball 
In the 2021–22 season, the women's basketball team won the RSC regular season and tournament championships. Their overall record was 32-3. They went on to the NAIA National Tournament and won the first ever national game in program history.

Notable alumni 

Bernie Bickerstaff, former NBA head coach and executive.
Matthew Boyles, professional race walker.
Frank Cremeans, represented the state of Ohio in the United States House of Representatives.
Bevo Francis, a legendary basketball player, put Rio Grande on the map in 1954 when he scored 113 points in a single game against Hillsdale College. Francis' feat stood as an NCAA record for 58 years until Jack Taylor of Grinnell College broke the mark with a 138-point performance against Faith Baptist Bible College on November 20, 2012.
Kendell Foster Crossen, pulp fiction and science fiction writer.
Ben Hunter, professional soccer player.
Bernard Lepkofker, competitive judoka 
George Poffenbarger, justice of the West Virginia Supreme Court of Appeals.
Tom Spencer, retired Major League Baseball outfielder
Robert M. Switzer, former U.S. Representative from Ohio.

References

External links 

 
 Official athletics website

 
Buildings and structures in Gallia County, Ohio
Education in Gallia County, Ohio
Private universities and colleges in Ohio
Free Will Baptist schools